Fabril Esporte Clube, commonly known as Fabril, is a Brazilian football club based in Lavras, Minas Gerais state. They competed in the Série C once.

History
The club was founded on September 2, 1932. They won the Campeonato Mineiro Second Level in 1984 and the Campeonato Mineiro do Interior in 1988. Fabril also competed in the Série C in 1988, when they were eliminated in the First Stage of the competition.

Achievements

 Campeonato Brasileiro Série C:
 Participation (1): 1988 (30th place)
 Campeonato Mineiro do Interior:
 Winners (1): 1988
 Campeonato Mineiro Second Level:
 Winners (1): 1984
 Runners-up (1): 1997
 Lavras Soccer League:
 Winners (5): 1949, 1953, 1956, 1957, 1958
 Runners-up (4): 1950, 1952, 1957

Stadium
Fabril Esporte Clube play their home games at Estádio Juventino Dias, commonly known as Estádio Municipal. The stadium has a maximum capacity of 5,000 people. They also play at Estádio UFLA, which is a property of the Federal University of Lavras, and it has a maximum capacity of 13,000 people.

References

Association football clubs established in 1932
Football clubs in Minas Gerais
1932 establishments in Brazil